Stefano Madia (31 December 1954 – 16 December 2004) was an Italian film actor. He appeared in twelve films between 1978 and 1993. At the 1979 Cannes Film Festival he won the award for Best Supporting Actor, for Vittorio Gassman's film Dear Father.

He is the father of Italian minister Marianna Madia.

Filmography

References

External links

1954 births
2004 deaths
20th-century Italian male actors
Italian male film actors
Male actors from Rome
Cannes Film Festival Award for Best Actor winners